Herrlee Glessner Creel (January 19, 1905June 1, 1994) was an American Sinologist and philosopher who specialized in Chinese philosophy and history, and was a professor of Chinese at the University of Chicago for nearly 40 years.  On his retirement, Creel was praised by his colleagues as an innovative pioneer on early Chinese civilization and as one who could write both for specialists and for the interested general public with cogency, lucidity, and grace.

Early years
Herrlee G. Creel was born on January 19, 1905, in Chicago, Illinois. He attended the University of Chicago as an undergraduate, graduating with a Ph.B. degree in 1926.  He then continued on at Chicago as a graduate student studying Chinese philosophy, earning an AM in 1927, followed by a PhD in 1929 with a dissertation entitled "Sinism: A Study of the Evolution of the Chinese World-view". He began his postdoctoral career as an assistant professor of psychology at Lombard College from 1929 to 1930. He was awarded fellowships by the American Council of Learned Societies (1930–1933), the Harvard-Yenching Institute (1931–1935) and the Rockefeller Foundation (1936, 1945 –1946). In 1936 he accepted a post at the University of Chicago, where he was an instructor in Chinese history and language until he was appointed assistant professor of early Chinese literature and institutions in 1937.

Creel was one of the founders of the university's Far Eastern studies program in the 1930s and had a major role in building its Far Eastern Library. He ordered some 5,000 books a year from dealers in China, then, in 1939, with support from the Rockefeller Foundation  he returned to China, then in the grips of the Second Sino-Japanese War and the city of Beiping (Beijing) was occupied by the Japanese Army. He bought more than 75,000 volumes for the library, especially those dealing with the pre-modern period. 

Creel was promoted to the rank of associate professor in 1941 and full Professor in 1949. He served as a Lieutenant Colonel of military intelligence in the United States Army from 1943 to 1945 during the Second World War. He remained as a professor until 1964, when he became the Martin A. Ryerson Distinguished Service Professor of Chinese History until 1974.

Societies and publishing 
Creel was a member of the Committee on Chinese Studies of the American Council of Learned Societies, a member of its Committee on Far Eastern Studies, and the President of the American Oriental Society. He was also a member of the Association for Asian Studies as well as a member of the American Philosophical Society. The most influential of Creel’s books include The Birth of China (1936), the first detailed account of the significance of the archaeological excavations at Anyang, which quickly attracted global interest; Studies in Early Chinese Culture (1937) which was an influential collection of monographic essays; Literary Chinese by the Inductive Method, vols. I–III (1938–52), a groundbreaking and controversial attempt to teach literary Chinese through carefully glossed excerpts of standard classical texts; Newspaper Chinese by the Inductive Method (1943), an effort to apply identical pedagogical techniques to the analysis of Chinese newspapers; Confucius, the Man and the Myth (1949), a critical analysis of the philosopher Confucius; Chinese Thought from Confucius to Mao Tse-tung (1953), a survey of Chinese thought; The Origins of Statecraft in China, Vol. 1: The Western Chou Empire (University of Chicago Press, 1970), a judicial account of the polity of the Western Zhou dynasty; What is Taoism? and Other Studies in Chinese Cultural History (University of Chicago Press, 1970) and Shen Pu-hai: A Chinese Political Philosophy of the Fourth Century B.C. (1974), a monograph on Shen Buhai, an early Chinese specialist on administrative technique.

Style and legacy
He is especially known for Confucius: The Man and the Myth (1949), which argued that Confucius had been misunderstood because legend had obscured the facts of his life and his ideas. Creel held that Confucius was a reformer and an individualist, as well as a democratic and revolutionary teacher.

From the start of his career in the 1930s, Creel was an outspoken proponent of the theory that Chinese characters are inherently ideographic in nature. Creel was opposed by sinologists Peter A. Boodberg and Paul Pelliot, who believed that phonetic principles played a large role in the early history of Chinese characters. The debate has continued many decades later without either side being able to discredit the other.

Creel died at his home in Palos Park, Illinois, after a long illness, on June 1, 1994, at the age of 89.

Selected works
 Creel, H. G. (1936).  The Birth of China. London: Jonathan Cape.  Rpt. New York: John Day, 1937; New York: Frederick Ungar: 1954.
 
 
 ——— (1938–52). Literary Chinese by the Inductive Method, 3 vols. Chicago: University of Chicago Press.
 ——— (1949). Confucius, the Man and the Myth. New York: John Day. Rpt. under title: Confucius and the Chinese Way, New York: Harper, 1960.
 ——— (1953). Chinese Thought from Confucius to Mao Tse-tung. Chicago: University of Chicago Press.
 ——— (1970). What is Taoism? and Other Studies in Cultural History. Chicago: University of Chicago Press.
 ——— (1970). The Origins of Statecraft in China, vol. 1.  Chicago: University of Chicago Press.
 ——— (1974). Shen Pu-hai. Chicago, London: The University of Chicago Press.

Notes

References 
 
 
 
 . A festschrift in Creel's honor.

External links
University of Chicago Chronicle obituary

American sinologists
University of Chicago alumni
University of Chicago faculty
1905 births
1994 deaths
People from Palos Park, Illinois